Amy Parks (born 10 June 1982 ) is an Australian journalist and broadcaster. She is a reporter for Seven News Melbourne from Melbourne. Parks was one of the original hosts of Nine Network's late night interactive quiz show, Quizmania (2006–2007). She was a reporter on Nine News Melbourne in 2008, before switching to rival network, Seven.

Early years
Parks was born on 10 June 1982. She was raised in Horsham, Victoria until 13 and then moved to the Bellarine Peninsula. She joined a junior Geelong theatre society and Matthew Flinders Girls Secondary College' jazz group. Parks was a singer in the school-based band, Sweethearts of Swing, and toured overseas.

Television
After being accepted to RMIT's Bachelor of Journalism course, Parks became very involved in community television, taking on the hosting role for three seasons of Raucous (a live-to-air music show), was the TV reporter on Darren & Brose, and also became both producer and presenter of Newsline and Pluck. It was during her time at RMIT that Parks was asked to join the team at Fox Footy and present 26 episodes of Young Guns, a show focusing on the lives and careers of young footballers.

Returning to university after Fox Footy, Parks finished her degree whilst doing various freelance journalism and presenting activities. These included work at The Age newspaper, Media Giants and the Essendon Football Club, as well as hosting Channel 31's Real Time Racing, and conducting a series of interviews over three years at the annual Falls Festival for a historical DVD.

Parks' next project saw her presenting a children's DVD, Talking Time, released commercially September 2006 in Australia, Canada, USA and NZ. In this role, Parks played beside a collection of puppets in a DVD that is aimed at increasing parents' awareness of the importance of instilling good speech practices in their children.

Quizmania
In July 2006 Parks was one of the original hosts of the Nine Network late-night phone-in quiz show, Quizmania. Her co-presenters were Brodie Young (ex-Big Brother intruder) and Nikki Osborne (an actress).

Media career
In 2008 Parks joined Nine News Melbourne as a reporter, prior to becoming a reporter Amy was a producer.

In 2009 Parks moved to Seven News Melbourne as a reporter. She was one of the Geelong Cup Ambassadors, with Geelong footballer Steve Johnson, in 2010. She achieved viral fame  when reporting from similarly-named sporting venue AAMI Park, with the video receiving more than 250,000 views on YouTube.

Music
Amy Parks joined Melbourne-based pop, rock band Loomset as lead vocalist in late 2001. Loomset had formed in 1999 by Tuffy and D. T. and had recorded material for their debut album, Disguise (2002). The group released their second album, Winterland in 2004, but disbanded soon after.

References

Australian television presenters
RMIT University alumni
Television personalities from Melbourne
1982 births
Living people
21st-century Australian singers
21st-century Australian women singers
Australian women television presenters